The 2022 Cali Open was a professional tennis tournament played on clay courts. It was the first edition of the tournament which was part of the 2022 ATP Challenger Tour. It took place in Cali, Colombia between 27 June and 2 July 2022.

Singles main draw entrants

Seeds

 1 Rankings as of 20 June 2022.

Other entrants
The following players received wildcards into the singles main draw:
  Tomás Barrios Vera
  Mateo Gómez
  Andrés Urrea

The following players received entry into the singles main draw as alternates:
  Michail Pervolarakis
  Evan Zhu

The following players received entry from the qualifying draw:
  Mateus Alves
  Román Andrés Burruchaga
  Nick Chappell
  Chung Yun-seong
  Juan Bautista Otegui
  Matías Zukas

Champions

Singles 

  Facundo Mena def.  Miljan Zekić 6–2, 7–6(7–3).

Doubles 

  Malek Jaziri /  Adrián Menéndez Maceiras def.  Keegan Smith /  Evan Zhu 7–5, 6–4.

References

Cali Open
Cali Open
June 2022 sports events in Colombia
July 2022 sports events in Colombia